Robert John Service  (born 29 October 1947) is a British historian, academic, and author who has written extensively on the history of the Soviet Union, particularly the era from the October Revolution to Stalin's death. He was until 2013 a professor of Russian history at the University of Oxford, a Fellow of St Antony's College, Oxford, and a senior Fellow at Stanford University's Hoover Institution. He is best known for his biographies of Vladimir Lenin, Joseph Stalin, and Leon Trotsky. He has been a fellow of the British Academy since 1998.

Career and reception
Service spent his undergraduate years at King's College, Cambridge, where he studied Russian and classical Greek. He went to Essex and Leningrad universities for his postgraduate work, and taught at Keele and the School of Slavonic and East European Studies, before joining Oxford University in 1998.

Between 1986 and 1995, Service published a three-volume biography of Vladimir Lenin. He wrote several works of general history on 20th-century Russia, including A History of Twentieth-Century Russia. He published a trilogy of biographies on the three most important Bolshevik leaders: Lenin (2000), Stalin (2004), and Trotsky (2009).

His biography of Trotsky was strongly criticised by Service's Hoover Institution colleague Bertrand Mark Patenaude in a review for the American Historical Review. Patenaude, reviewing Service's book alongside a rebuttal by the Trotskyist David North (In Defence of Leon Trotsky), charged Service with making dozens of factual errors, misrepresenting evidence, and "fail[ing] to examine in a serious way Trotsky's political ideas". Service responded that the book's factual errors were minor and that Patenaude's own book on Trotsky presented him as a "noble martyr". The book was criticised by the German historian of communism Hermann Weber, who led a campaign to prevent Suhrkamp Verlag from publishing it in Germany. Fourteen historians and sociologists signed a letter to the publishing house. The letter cited 'a host of factual errors,' the 'repugnant connotations' of the passages in which Service deals with Trotsky's Jewish origins, implicitly accusing him of anti-Semitism, and Service's recourse to 'formulas associated with Stalinist propaganda' for the purpose of discrediting Trotsky. Suhrkamp announced in February 2012 that it would publish a German translation of Robert Service's Trotsky in July 2012. The book won the Duff Cooper Prize in the publication year 2009.

Works

 The Bolshevik Party in Revolution 1917–23: A Study in Organizational Change (1979)
 Lenin: A Political Life (in three volumes: 1985, 1991 and 1995) 
 A History of Twentieth-Century Russia (1997)
 The Penguin History of Modern Russia From Tsarism to the 21st Century (1997)
 A History of Modern Russia, from Nicholas II to Putin  (1998, Second edition in 2003)
 The Russian Revolution, 1900–27  (Studies in European History) (1999)
 Lenin: A Biography  (2000)
 Russia: Experiment with a People  (2002)
 Stalin: A Biography (2004), Oxford, 715 pages ill.  (2004)
 Comrades: A World History of Communism (2007)
 Trotsky: A Biography  (2009)
 Spies and Commissars: Bolshevik Russia and the West (2011)
 The End of the Cold War: 1985–1991 (2015)
 The Last of the Tsars: Nicholas II and the Russian Revolution (2017)
 Russia and Its Islamic World (2017)
Kremlin Winter: Russia and the Second Coming of Vladimir Putin (2019)

References

External links

 Robert Service's homepage
 
 
Robert Service on The Guardian

 
1947 births
Academics of Keele University
Academics of the UCL School of Slavonic and East European Studies
Alumni of the University of Essex
British anti-communists
Fellows of St Antony's College, Oxford
Alumni of King's College, Cambridge
Historians of Russia
Historians of communism
Living people
Saint Petersburg State University alumni
Stalinism-era scholars and writers
Writers about the Soviet Union
Hoover Institution people